Berric is a commune in the Morbihan department in Brittany in northwestern France.

Population
Inhabitants of Berric are called Berricois.

See also
Communes of the Morbihan department

References

External links

Mayors of Morbihan Association 

Communes of Morbihan